Asia Minor is an album by Jamaican-born jazz trumpeter Dizzy Reece featuring performances recorded in 1962 and originally released on the New Jazz label.

Reception

The Allmusic review by Scott Yanow awarded the album 4½ stars and stated: "The solos tend to be concise but quite meaningful, and, overall, this hard bop but occasionally surprising session is quite memorable".

Track listing
All compositions by Dizzy Reece except where noted.
 "The Shadow of Khan" – 5:31
 "The Story of Love" (Carlos Eleta Almarán) – 4:32
 "Yamask" – 5:40
 "Spiritus Parkus [Parker's Spirit]" (Cecil Payne) – 4:40
 "Summertime" (George Gershwin, Ira Gershwin, DuBose Heyward) – 7:51
 "Ackmet" – 8:11

Personnel
Dizzy Reece – trumpet
Joe Farrell – tenor saxophone, flute
Cecil Payne – baritone saxophone
Hank Jones – piano
Ron Carter – bass
Charlie Persip – drums

References

New Jazz Records albums
Dizzy Reece albums
1962 albums
Albums recorded at Van Gelder Studio